The 2015 Sochi GP2 Series round was a GP2 Series motor race held on October 10 and 11, 2015 at Sochi Autodrom, Russia. It was the ninth round of the 2015 GP2 Series. The race supported the 2015 Russian Grand Prix.

Classification

Qualifying

Feature Race

Sprint Race

See also 
 2015 Russian Grand Prix
 2015 Sochi GP3 Series round

References

External links
 

2015 GP2 Series rounds
GP2